The 2000 United States House of Representatives elections in South Carolina were held on November 7, 2000 to select six Representatives for two-year terms from the state of South Carolina.  The primary elections for the Democrats and the Republicans were held on June 13 and the runoff elections were held two weeks later on June 27.  All five incumbents who ran were re-elected and the open seat in the 1st congressional district was retained by the Republicans.  The composition of the state delegation remained four Republicans and two Democrats.

Overview

1st congressional district
Incumbent Republican Congressman Mark Sanford of the 1st congressional district, in office since 1995, honored his campaign pledge that he would only serve three terms and retired.  Henry E. Brown, Jr. won the Republican primary and defeated Democrat Andy Brack in the general election.

Republican primary

General election results

|-
| 
| colspan=5 |Republican hold
|-

2nd congressional district
Incumbent Republican Congressman Floyd Spence of the 2nd congressional district, in office since 1971, defeated Democratic challenger Jane Frederick.

General election results

|-
| 
| colspan=5 |Republican hold
|-

3rd congressional district
Incumbent Republican Congressman Lindsey Graham of the 3rd congressional district, in office since 1995, defeated Democratic challenger George L. Brightharp.

General election results

|-
| 
| colspan=5 |Republican hold
|-
|colspan=6|*Brightharp also ran under the United Citizens Party; his totals are combined.
|-

4th congressional district
Incumbent Republican Congressman Jim DeMint of the 4th congressional district, in office since 1999, defeated Franklin D. Raddish in the Republican primary and won the general election against several minor party candidates.

Republican primary

General election results

|-
| 
| colspan=5 |Republican hold
|-
|colspan=6|*Ashy also ran under the United Citizens Party; his totals are combined.
|-

5th congressional district
Incumbent Democratic Congressman John M. Spratt, Jr. of the 5th congressional district, in office since 1983, defeated Republican challenger Carl L. Gullick.

General election results

|-
| 
| colspan=5 |Democratic hold
|-

6th congressional district
Incumbent Democratic Congressman Jim Clyburn of the 6th congressional district, in office since 1993, defeated Republican challenger Vince Ellison.

General election results

|-
| 
| colspan=5 |Democratic hold
|-

See also
United States House elections, 2000
South Carolina's congressional districts

References

External links
South Carolina Election Returns

US House
2000
South Carolina